Piano player may refer to:

Pianist, who plays the piano
Piano Player (album), 1998 album featuring jazz pianist Bill Evans
The Piano Player (Ramsey Lewis album), 1970
The Piano Player (2002 film), starring Dennis Hopper, Christopher Lambert & Diane Kruger
The Piano Player (Maksim Mrvica album), 2003
The Piano Teacher (film) (French: La Pianiste), or The Piano Player, a 2001 film directed by Michael Haneke
A player piano, or "automatic piano"